Aphrodite Les Folies – Live in London is the sixth live album by Australian singer Kylie Minogue.

Background and release
The show was filmed in 3D during her "Aphrodite: Les Folies Tour" over two nights at The O2 Arena in London and directed by William Baker and Marcus Viner. A 2-CD LP was released with the film. It aired on Sky 3D as well as in cinemas in the United Kingdom and Ireland on 19 June 2011.  It has since been shown in Australia, New Zealand, Mexico, Brazil and Poland in August 2011. Then in Chile, Colombia, Costa Rica, Denmark, Croatia, El Salvador, The Netherlands, Peru, South Africa, Serbia, Bulgaria and Indonesia in September 2011. It was also shown in Belgium and Argentina in October 2011, and debuted in the United States on Palladia in December 2011. A CD/DVD/Blu-ray was released on 28 November 2011. The film was released in three formats. Firstly, as a DVD with bonus two-disc audio recording of the concert. Secondly, as a limited edition box set with a DVD, two-disc audio recording and booklet. Lastly, there was also a Blu-ray release which includes a 2D and 3D recording of the show. All three packages also include the behind-the-scenes tour documentary, Just Add Water.

Critical response 
The live album and DVD were met with positive response from critics. Contact Music gave it a positive review, while the UK's The Independent gave the bundle a total of 4/5.

Track listing

Charts 
Video

Album

References

British documentary films
2011 live albums
3D concert films
2011 3D films
Kylie Minogue live albums